Definition of Fear is a 2015 British horror thriller film written and directed by British filmmaker James Simpson, starring Jacqueline Fernandez. The film premiered at the 4th Delhi International Film Festival in December 2015. The film was released on DVD on 30 January 2018. The film is set for an August 2018 release date in India. A first look trailer is released online.

Plot 
Four girls spend the weekend at a holiday cabin overlooking a beautiful lake, hoping for a peaceful and fun getaway. They quickly learn that all is not how it seems, and that they are not alone.

Cast 
Jacqueline Fernandez as Sarah Fording - a psychology student
Katherine Barrell as Victoria Burns - a dancer
Mercedes Papalia as Frankie Toms - a personal trainer
Blythe Hubbard as Rachel Moore - a singer

Production

Filming 
Filming began on 10 October 2014, in Ottawa, Ontario, Canada.

Release
The film has been shown in many film festivals including its premier in Delhi international film festival. The film was scheduled to release in India in the month of August 2018.

References

External links 
 

2015 films
2015 horror films
2015 horror thriller films
British horror thriller films
2010s English-language films
2010s British films